This is a list of buildings in Milan.

Churches

Paleochristian, Romanesque 

 Basilica of Sant'Ambrogio
 Basilica of San Calimero  
 Basilica of Sant'Eustorgio
 Basilica of San Lorenzo   
 Basilica of San Nazaro in Brolo
 Basilica of San Simpliciano
 Basilica of S.Tecla (ruins)
 Basilica of S.Vincenzo in Prato
 Church of San Babila
 Church of San Bernardino alle Monache
 Church of San Faustino e Giovita
 Church of San Giovanni in Conca (ruins)
 Church of San Martino in Lambrate
 Church of San Pietro dei Pellegrini
 Church of San Sepolcro
 Church of San Siro alla Vepra
 Church of Santa Maria la Rossa
 Church of Santa Maria della Fontana
 Church of Santi Re Magi

Gothic 

 Milan Cathedral, the Duomo
 Abbey of Chiaravalle
 Abbey of Mirasole
 Abbey of Viboldone
 Basilica of Sant'Eufemia
 Church of San Cristoforo sul Naviglio
 Church of San Gottardo in Corte
 Church of San Marco
 Church of Santa Maria Bianca della Misericordia
 Church of Santa Maria del Carmine
 Church of Santa Maria della Pace
 Church of Santa Maria delle Grazie al Naviglio
 Church of Santa Maria Incoronata
 Church of Santa Maria Podone
 Church of San Pietro in Gessate

Renaissance 

 Certosa of Garegnano
 Church di San Bartolomeo
 Church of San Gioachimo 
 Church of Santa Maria delle Grazie, with Leonardo's Last Supper
 Church of Santa Maria dei Miracoli
 Church of San Maurizio al Monastero Maggiore
 Church of Santa Maria presso San Satiro

Mannerism 

 Church of Sant'Antonio Abate
 Church of San Barnaba
 Church of San Carlo al Lazzaretto
 Church of San Fedele
 Church of Santa Maria della Passione
 Church of San Sebastiano
 Church of San Vito in Pasquirolo

Baroque 

 Basilica of Santo Stefano Maggiore
 Church of Sant'Alessandro in Zebedia
 Church of Sant'Angelo
 Church of San Bernardino alle Ossa
 Church of San Francesco di Paola
 Church of San Giorgio al Palazzo
 Church of San Giuseppe
 Church of Santa Maria al Paradiso
 Church of Santa Maria alla Porta
 Church of Santa Maria Annunciata all'Ospedale Maggiore
 Church of Santa Maria Assunta in Camposanto
 Church of Santa Maria Assunta in Turro
 Church of Santa Maria della Vittoria
 Church of Santa Maria Segreta
 Church of San Michele Arcangelo in Precotto
 Church of San Michele ai Nuovi Sepolcri
 Church of San Nicolao
 Church of San Paolo Converso
 Church of San Raffaele
 Church of San Vittore al Corpo

Neoclassic 

 Church of San Carlo al Corso
 Church of Santa Maria della Consolazione
 Church of San Tomaso in Terramara

Notable monuments 

Castello Sforzesco
Central Station
Cimitero Maggiore di Milano
Cimitero Monumentale
FieraMilano at Rho
Galleria del Corso
Galleria Vittorio Emanuele II

Palaces and villas 

13th century

 Casa Panigarola
Palazzo della Ragione

14th century

 Loggia degli Osii

15th century

 Casa Atellani 
 Casa Fontana Silvestri 
 Casa Parravicini
 Cascina (della) Boscaiola or Cascina Boscarola
Ospedale Maggiore (Ca' Granda), former city hospital designed by Filarete, now housing the University of Milan
 Palazzo Acerbi
 Palazzo Borromeo 
 Palazzo Carmagnola
 Palazzo Castani
 Palazzo Isimbardi
 Palazzo Pozzobonelli-Isimbardi
 Villa Mirabello or Cascina Mirabello

16th century

 Palazzo Casati Stampa di Soncino
 Palazzo di Brera 
 Palazzo dei Giureconsulti 
 Palazzo delle Scuole Palatine 
 Palazzo Marino 
 Palazzo Recalcati
 Palazzo Taverna 
 Villa Simonetta

17th century

 Casa Buttafava 
 Casa Crespi 
 Casa degli Omenoni  
 Casa Toscanini  
 Palazzo Annoni 
 Palazzo Arcivescovile   
 Palazzo Cusani  
 Palazzo del Capitano di Giustizia  
 Palazzo del Senato (Milano) 
 Palazzo delle ex Scuole Arcimbolde  
 Palazzo delle Stelline  
 Palazzo Dugnani  
 Palazzo Durini  
 Palazzo Erba Odescalchi  
 Palazzo Litta o Arese 
 Palazzo Olivazzi  
 Palazzo Orsini  
 Palazzo Pusterla Brivio 
 Palazzo Sormani

18th century

 Casa Berchet 
 Casa Beccaria 
 Casa Buzzoni 
 Casa Monti (Milano)
 Palazzina Appiani
 Palazzo Belgiojoso 
 Palazzo Citterio 
 Palazzo Clerici
 Palazzo Confalonieri
 Palazzo Fagnani
 Palazzo Gallarati Scotti
 Palazzo Greppi
 Palazzo Litta-Cusani 
 Palazzo Mellerio
 Palazzo Morando-Attendolo-Bolognini 
 Palazzo Moriggia 
Palazzo Reale, Royal Palace
 Palazzo Serbelloni
 Palazzo Sormani Andreani
 Palazzo Trivulzio
 Palazzo Visconti di Modrone

19th century

 Ca' de Facc 
 Ca' de Sass
 Casa Alesina 
 Casa Bottelli 
 Casa Bettoni o dei Bersaglieri 
 Casa Borella 
 Casa Bosi Pelitti 
 Casa Broggi 
 Casa Candiani 
 Casa Castini 
 Casa Celesia 
 Casa Chicchieri 
 Casa Ciani 
 Casa Dell'Acqua
 Palazzo d'Este (viale Beatrice d'Este 23)
 Casa Fasoli
 Casa Gadda-Portaluppi 
 Casa Grondona 
 Casa Manzoni
 Casa Negri
 Casa Pirovano 
 Casa Poldi Pezzoli 
 Casa Reininghaus
 Casa Rigamonti 
 Casa Rossi 
 Casa Sardi 
 Casa Sartorelli 
 Palazzo Anguissola 
 Palazzo Archinto 
 Palazzo Barozzi 
 Palazzo Besana 
 Palazzo Bagatti-Valsecchi 
 Palazzo Beltrami 
 Palazzo Bonacosa 
 Palazzo Borgazzi 
 Palazzo Brentani 
 Palazzo Cagnola
 Palazzo Carcano-Tondani 
 Palazzo del Museo di Scienze Naturali 
 Palazzo dell'ex Kursaal Diana 
 Palazzo della Permanente 
 Palazzo della Società per le Strade Ferrate del Mediterraneo 
 Palazzo della Veneranda Fabbrica del Duomo 
 Palazzo Diotti anche conosciuto come "Palazzo della prefettura"
 Palazzo Ercole Turati 
 Palazzo Francesco Turati
 Palazzo Haas 
 Palazzo Luraschi 
 Palazzo Melzi d'Eril
 Palazzo Porro-Lambertenghi 
 Palazzo Rusconi-Clerici 
 Palazzo Saporiti 
 Palazzo Savonelli 
 Palazzo Spinola 
 Palazzo Talenti 
 Palazzo Tarsis
 Palazzo Taverna 
 Palazzo Torelli-Viollier 
 Villa Belgiojoso-Bonaparte, known as the Royal Villa of Milan

20th century

 Ca' Brutta 
 Casa Apostolo 
 Casa Caccia Dominioni 
 Casa Campanini 
 Casa Cambiaghi 
 Casa Ferrario
 Casa Galimberti 
 Casa Guazzoni 
 Casa Laugier 
 Casa Morganti 
 Casa Piana 
 Castello Cova 
 Palazzo Berri-Meregalli 
 Palazzo Bolchini 
 Palazzo Castiglioni 
 Palazzo Civita 
 Palazzo Crespi 
 Palazzo Cusini 
 Palazzo di Giustizia
 Palazzo del cinema Odeon
 Palazzo del Toro 
 Palazzo dell'Arte
 Palazzo della Banca Commerciale Italiana
 Palazzo della Banca d'Italia
 Palazzo della Banca di Roma
 Palazzo della Banca Popolare di Milano
 Palazzo della ex Borsa 
 Palazzo della Rinascente 
 Palazzo della Società Reale Mutua di Assicurazioni
 Palazzo Fidia 
 Palazzo Meroni 
 Palazzo Mezzanotte
 Palazzo Veronesi 
 Torre Rasini 
 Torre San Babila 
 Torre Velasca 
 Villa Necchi Campiglio
 Villino Calabresi 
 Villino Gotico
 Villino Hoepli

Skyscrapers and towers 

 Bosco Verticale
 Branca Tower
 Centro Svizzero
 Palazzo Lombardia
 Pirelli Tower 
 Torre Diamante
 Torre Garibaldi
 Torre Solaria
 Breda Tower
 Galfa Tower
 Telecom Tower, in Rozzano
 Velasca Tower

Gates 

 Porta Garibaldi
 Porta Genova
 Porta Nuova (medieval)
 Porta Sempione
 Porta Ticinese (medieval)
 Porta Ticinese (19th century)
 Porta Venezia
 Porta Vittoria
 Porta Volta
 Pusterla di Sant'Ambrogio

Notable monuments 

Alessandro Manzoni in Piazza San Fedele
Colonne di San Lorenzo
Disc of Pomodoro
Fontana del Piermarini in Piazza Fontana
Mazzini's monument in Piazza della Repubblica
Monumento Cinque Giornate
Napoleone of Canova in Brera
Oldrado da Trasseno del Palazzo della Ragione
San Carlo Borromeo in Piazza Borromeo
Leonardo's monument in Piazza della Scala
Roman amphitheatre (scant remains)
Archi di Porta Nuova
Leonardo da Vinci's Horse Statue at Hippodrome
The Needle and the Yarn in Piazza Cadorna

Museums, galleries and exhibition spaces 

Art museums

 Biblioteca d'arte del Castello Sforzesco
 Case Museo di Milano
 Civico museo di arte contemporanea
 Galleria d'Arte Moderna (GAM)
 Gallerie di Piazza Scala
 Galleria vinciana
 Museo Bagatti Valsecchi
 Museo degli strumenti musicali
 Museo del Duomo
 Museo del Novecento
 Museo delle arti decorative
 Museo Diocesano
 Museo Poldi Pezzoli
 Padiglione d'arte contemporanea
 Palazzo Reale di Milano
 Pinacoteca Ambrosiana e Biblioteca Ambrosiana
 Pinacoteca del Castello Sforzesco
 Pinacoteca di Brera
 Raccolte d'arte applicate
 Triennale di Milano

Historical museums

 Antiquarium Alda Levi
 Biblioteca Trivulziana
 Casa Manzoni
 Civica raccolta delle stampe "Achille Bertarelli"
 Civico archivio fotografico
 Museo archeologico
 Museo d'arte antica
 Museo del mobile
 Museo del Risorgimento
 Museo della Basilica di Sant'Ambrogio
 Museo della Basilica di Santa Maria della Passione
 Museo della Preistoria e Protostoria
 Museo della Pusterla - Mostra permanente di Criminologia e Armi Antiche
 Museo di Arte Estremo-Orientale e di Etnografia
 Museo di Storia Contemporanea
 Museo Egizio

Science museums

 Acquario civico di Milano
 Museo di Storia Naturale
 Museo della Scienza e della Tecnologia "Leonardo da Vinci"
 Planetario di Milano

Other museums

 La Permanente
 Museo Civico Marinaro "U. Mursia"
 Museo d'arte e scienza
 Museo dei Navigli
 Museo del Cinema
 Museo del Giocattolo e del Bambino
 Museo delle Cere
 Museo di Milano
 Museo Teatrale alla Scala
 San Siro Museum

Theaters 

Teatro alla Scala
Teatro degli Arcimboldi
Piccolo teatro
Teatro Lirico 
Teatro Carcano
CRT - Teatro dell'Arte 
Manzoni
Ventaglio Nazionale
Nuovo 
Nuovo Piccolo Teatro 
Piccolo Teatro di Milano 
San Babila 
Smeraldo
Ciak 
Della 14a 
Filodrammatici
Litta
Olmetto 
Out Off 
L'Elfo
Porta Romana
Franco Parenti 
Teatro Studio
Verdi

Universities 
Politecnico di Milano
Università Statale
Università Statale Milano-Bicocca
Università Cattolica del Sacro Cuore
Università Bocconi
Scuola Superiore di Direzione Aziendale - Bocconi
Università I.U.L.M.
Università C.Cattaneo L.I.U.C.
Università Vita-Salute San Raffaele
L.U.C. Beato Angelico
Accademia di Belle Arti di Brera
Conservatorio Superiore "G. Verdi" di Milano
Istituto Europeo di Design
I.S.E.F.
Nuova Accademia di Belle Arti Milano - NABA

See also
List of buildings

 
Milan
Buildings